Spring Hill School District may refer to:

 Spring Hill School District (Arkansas), based in Hope, Arkansas.
 Spring Hill School District (Kansas), based in Spring Hill, Kansas.
 Spring Hill Independent School District, based in Longview, Texas.